Franklin Ulises López González (born 16 August 1982) is a Nicaraguan footballer who currently plays for Real Estelí in the Primera División de Nicaragua.

Club career
He started his career at Diriangén and also played for Parmalat. In 2007 López moved to Real Estelí.

International career
López made his debut for Nicaragua in a February 2004 friendly match against Haiti and has earned a total of 20 caps, scoring 1 goal1. He has represented his country in 3 FIFA World Cup qualification matches and played at the 2005, 2007, and 2009 UNCAF Nations Cups as well as at the 2009 CONCACAF Gold Cup.

His final international was a July 2009 CONCACAF Gold Cup against Panama.

International goals
Scores and results list Honduras' goal tally first.

References

External links
 

1982 births
Living people
People from Carazo Department
Association football midfielders
Nicaraguan men's footballers
Nicaragua international footballers
2005 UNCAF Nations Cup players
2007 UNCAF Nations Cup players
2009 UNCAF Nations Cup players
2009 CONCACAF Gold Cup players
Diriangén FC players
Real Estelí F.C. players